Van Zile is a surname. Notable people with the name include:

 Edward Sims Van Zile (1863–1931), American writer
 Philip T. Van Zile (1843–1919), American politician and judge from Michigan

See also
 Van Zile House, 1736 house in Midland Park, Bergen County, New Jersey, United States

Surnames of Dutch origin